William John Skeffington (1747–1811) was an Irish politician.

Skeffington was a Member of Parliament representing Antrim Borough in the Irish House of Commons from 1768 until the constituency's disenfranchisement under the Acts of Union 1800.

References

1747 births
1811 deaths
Irish MPs 1761–1768
Irish MPs 1769–1776
Irish MPs 1776–1783
Irish MPs 1783–1790
Irish MPs 1790–1797
Irish MPs 1798–1800
Members of the Parliament of Ireland (pre-1801) for County Antrim constituencies